The 2006-07 Memphis Grizzlies season was the team's 12th in the NBA. They began the season hoping to improve upon their 49-33 output from the previous season. However, they came up 27 games shy, finishing 22–60, and failed to qualify for the playoffs for the first time in four seasons. The Grizzlies had the worst team defensive rating in the NBA.

Mike Fratello was fired in December after a 6–24 start. He was later replaced by Tony Barone.

Team captain Pau Gasol missed the first half of the season after suffering a foot injury during the Olympics.

Draft picks

Roster

Regular season

Season standings

Record vs. opponents

Game log

Player statistics

Regular season 

|-
| 
| 75 || 23 || 27.5 || .434 || .379 || .810 || 1.9 || 4.6 || .7 || .1 || 13.2
|-
| 
| 28 || 1 || 11.2 || .494 || .409 || style=";"| .926 || 2.1 || 1.1 || .8 || .0 || 4.5
|-
| 
| 3 || 0 || 5.7 || . || . || . || .7 || .3 || .0 || .0 || .0
|-
| 
| 59 || 59 || 36.2 || style=";"| .538 || .273 || .748 || style=";"| 9.8 || 3.4 || .5 || style=";"| 2.1 || style=";"| 20.8
|-
| 
| 78 || 43 || 27.0 || .422 || .364 || .727 || 4.5 || 1.3 || .9 || .9 || 10.8
|-
| 
| 29 || 8 || 18.7 || .416 || .269 || .674 || 2.3 || 3.1 || .7 || .2 || 5.2
|-
| 
| 59 || 19 || 12.8 || style=";"| .538 || . || .661 || 3.1 || .3 || .4 || .6 || 4.4
|-
| 
| 78 || 25 || 21.4 || .477 || style=";"| .417 || .793 || 2.0 || .9 || .5 || .3 || 7.5
|-
| 
| 29 || 14 || 19.3 || .377 || .297 || .735 || 2.1 || 1.1 || .8 || .1 || 5.6
|-
| 
| 48 || 12 || 20.1 || .457 || .283 || .796 || 2.0 || .9 || 1.1 || .0 || 7.7
|-
| 
| 10 || 0 || 17.5 || .368 || .375 || .893 || 3.1 || 3.2 || style=";"| 1.4 || .1 || 5.6
|-
| 
| 70 || style=";"| 69 || style=";"| 39.1 || .460 || .406 || .793 || 5.4 || 4.3 || .8 || .3 || 18.5
|-
| 
| 7 || 0 || 4.7 || .143 || .000 || .000 || 1.3 || .0 || .1 || .0 || .3
|-
| 
| 54 || 18 || 17.9 || .452 || .000 || .725 || 4.8 || .6 || .7 || .2 || 5.2
|-
| 
| 62 || 51 || 24.2 || .391 || .337 || .795 || 2.2 || style=";"| 4.8 || .8 || .0 || 7.5
|-
| 
| 54 || 18 || 19.1 || .465 || .000 || .724 || 4.6 || .3 || .6 || 1.1 || 7.8
|-
| 
| 23 || 7 || 11.2 || .400 || . || .583 || 2.8 || .1 || .3 || .5 || 2.3
|-
| 
| style=";"| 82 || 43 || 26.2 || .524 || .000 || .771 || 5.1 || .9 || .5 || .4 || 12.7
|}

Awards and records
Rudy Gay, NBA All-Rookie Team 1st Team

Transactions

References

Memphis Grizzlies seasons
Memphis
Memphis Grizzlies
Memphis Grizzlies
Events in Memphis, Tennessee